Richard Astry (c. 1632 – 1714) was an English antiquary.

Life
Astry was born in Huntingdonshire in or about 1632. He was admitted to Queens' College, Cambridge on 14 March 1647–8, proceeded B.A. in 1651 and in 1654 obtained from his college a grace for M.A., though that degree is not recorded in the university registers. After leaving the university he was elected an alderman of Huntingdon, and he was buried at St. Mary's in that town on 11 August 1714, aged 83.

Works
He was, according to Thompson Cooper in the Dictionary of National Biography, the author of a quarto volume of collections, heraldic and topographical, relating Huntingdonshire, preserved in the Lansdowne MS. 921. The authorship of this manuscript, is also ascribed to Sir Robert Bruce Cotton. Thomas Baker made copious extracts from this work in the thirty-sixth volume of his manuscripts, which were later deposited in the University Library, Cambridge.

Astry also drew up Alphabetical Catalogues of English Surnames, with the arms belonging to them, and the particular times that the persons recorded lived; forming three volumes, formerly in the possession of the Rev. Henry Freeman, of Norman Cross.

References

Attribution

1630s births
1714 deaths
17th-century English writers
17th-century English male writers
18th-century English people
English antiquarians
Alumni of Queens' College, Cambridge